Aaron Salem Boupendza Pozzi (born 7 August 1996) is a Gabonese professional footballer who plays as a forward for Saudi club Al-Shabab and the Gabon national team.

Career
Boupendza is a youth exponent of Gabonese club CF Mounana.

In August 2016, Boupendza signed for Ligue 1 side FC Girondins de Bordeaux to play for the club's reserve team in Championnat National 3. In August 2017, he joined Championnat National side Pau FC on loan. In August 2020, Boupendza signed a two-year contract with Turkish club Hatayspor. In August 2021, he joined Qatar Stars League club Al-Arabi.

On 9 August 2022, Boupendza joined Saudi Arabian club Al-Shabab on a three-year deal.

Career statistics
Scores and results list Gabon's goal tally first, score column indicates score after each Boupendza goal.

Honours
Individual
Süper Lig top goalscorer: 2020–21

References

External links
 
 

1996 births
Living people
People from Moanda
Association football forwards
Gabonese footballers
Gabon international footballers
CF Mounana players
FC Girondins de Bordeaux players
Pau FC players
Gazélec Ajaccio players
Tours FC players
C.D. Feirense players
Hatayspor footballers
Al-Arabi SC (Qatar) players
Al-Shabab FC (Riyadh) players
Ligue 2 players
Championnat National players
Liga Portugal 2 players
Süper Lig players
Qatar Stars League players
Saudi Professional League players
Gabonese expatriate footballers
Expatriate footballers in France
Expatriate footballers in Portugal
Expatriate footballers in Turkey
Expatriate footballers in Qatar
Expatriate footballers in Saudi Arabia
Gabonese expatriate sportspeople in France
Gabonese expatriate sportspeople in Portugal
Gabonese expatriate sportspeople in Turkey
Gabonese expatriate sportspeople in Qatar
Gabonese expatriate sportspeople in Saudi Arabia
21st-century Gabonese people
2021 Africa Cup of Nations players
Gabon A' international footballers
2016 African Nations Championship players